Packin' It In is a 1983 American made-for-television comedy-drama film starring Richard Benjamin and Paula Prentiss.

It was directed by Jud Taylor.

Plot
A family decide to move to Oregon.

Cast
Richard Benjamin as Gary Webber
Paula Prentiss as Diana Webber
Tony Roberts as Charlie Baumgarten
Andrea Marcovicci as Rita Baumgarten
Molly Ringwald as Melissa Webber
Mari Gorman as Brooklyn Mary
Sam Whipple as Zack Estep
Kenneth McMillan as Howard Estep
David Hollander as Jay Webber
Philip Proctor as Cliff, Gary's Coworker

Production
Benjamin made it just after making his feature film debut as director, My Favorite Year. Although set in Oregon, the film was shot in Vancouver.

Benjamin and Prentiss brought their two children along on location. "That was great and there was just a nice family feeling," Benjamin said. "Paula and I have been married for 22 years. I was in a movie a few years ago called The Last Married Couple in America and now we are - at least we're one of the last in show business, anyway. We're real close and we like to work together. We have not worked together in television since we did the series called 'He and She' in 1970 and we had a great time doing that."

Reception
The New York Times said the film had "some very funny bits and pieces. But the overall conception never quite holds together. It is only sporadically as good as it should be."

References

External links
Packin' It In at TCMDB
Packin' It In at BFI
Packin It In at IMDb

1983 films
1983 television films
1983 comedy-drama films
American comedy-drama television films
Films directed by Jud Taylor
Films scored by Mark Snow
CBS network films
1983 comedy films
1983 drama films
1980s English-language films
1980s American films